Andrew Stoddard is a Democratic member of the Utah State House of Representatives, representing the 40th District since 2019. He lives in Sandy, Utah.

Education and Early Career
Stoddard graduated from Brighton High School. He later earned a bachelor's degree from the University of Utah and a law degree from Brigham Young University. He 
worked in various positions in education, volunteering and working for agencies dealing with criminal justice, including the Utah Crime Victims Clinic, Rocky Mountain Innocence Center, and Murray City. Stoddard also served as the Chair of the Midvale Community Council, and as a Murray City Prosecutor for almost a decade. Stoddard currently works as a personal injury attorney for Craig Swapp & Associates.

Political career
Stoddard was first elected on November 8, 2018. He defeated the incumbent, Republican Bruce Cutler, with 55% of the vote. During his first term, he sponsored gun control legislation.

In the 2022 General Session, Stoddard served on the Executive Appropriations Committee, the House Ethics Committee, the House Law Enforcement and Criminal Justice Committee, the House Revenue and Taxation Committee, the Infrastructure and General Government Appropriations Subcommittee, and the Legislative Management Committee

In the 2023 General Session, Stoddard served on the Law Enforcement & Criminal Justice Committee, Government Operations Committee, House Rules Committee, and the House Ethics Committee.

2022 Sponsored Legislation
HB0057	Government Records Access Amendments
HB0073S01	Post Certification Amendments
HB0309	Process Server Amendments
HB0310	Vital Records Special Characters
HB0314S01	Inheritance Disqualification Amendments
HB0325	Mental Health Support and Law Enforcement Co-response
HCR002	Concurrent Resolution Encouraging Discussion about Prevention of Child Sexual Abuse, 
HCR014 Concurrent Resolution Honoring Utah Olympians and Paralympians

Personal life
Stoddard spent most of his childhood in Sandy, Utah. He currently lives in Midvale, Utah and is married and has 4 children.

References

External links

Living people
University of Utah alumni
Brigham Young University alumni
Democratic Party members of the Utah House of Representatives
People from Sandy, Utah
Year of birth missing (living people)
21st-century American politicians